Camp Bonneville is a former United States Army post located near Vancouver, Washington. It was established in 1909 and used by the U.S. Army as a rifle range and weapons training facility for troops stationed at Fort Vancouver. Camp Bonneville recommended for closure under the 1995 Base Realignment and Closure Commission and turned over to the Clark County government for re-use as a public park. Cleanup of the  site began in the late 2000s, but was halted due to the discovery of toxic chemicals related to military use, including RDX and perchlorate.

References

External links
Map of the camp on Flickr

Installations of the United States Army in Washington (state)
Military installations closed in the 2000s